Own the Night is the third studio album by American country music trio Lady Antebellum. It was released on September 13, 2011 through Capitol Nashville. This is the follow up album to their previous Grammy Award winning album Need You Now. The production on the album was handled by Paul Worley and Lady Antebellum. The album was supported by four singles: "Just a Kiss", "We Owned the Night", "Dancin' Away with My Heart", and "Wanted You More".

Own The Night received mixed to positive reviews, with some critics praising its production and Hillary Scott's and Charles Kelley's vocals, calling it an improvement over their previous two albums, while others criticized its lyrical content and lack of personality, calling it a step downward from their previous albums. The album was also a commercial success, debuting at number one on the US Billboard 200, selling 347,000 copies in its first week. This became their second number-one album in the US and one of the most successful country albums of 2011. It also topped the Billboard Top Country Albums. At the 54th Grammy Awards, the album won the Grammy Award for Best Country Album.

Singles
The album spawned four singles: "Just a Kiss", "We Owned the Night", "Dancin' Away with My Heart", and "Wanted You More". "Just a Kiss" is the lead single from the album and was released for digital download on May 2, 2011. The single was a commercial and critical success, debuting and peaking at number seven on the US Billboard Hot 100, making it their highest debut on the chart. It also topped the Billboard Hot Country Songs, making it their fifth number-one single on the chart.

Follow up singles were "We Owned the Night", "Dancin' Away with My Heart" and "Wanted You More", which charted moderately in the US Hot Country Songs. Both it and "We Owned the Night" peaked at number one on the US Hot Country Songs charts, with "Dancin' Away with My Heart" peaking at number two and "Wanted You More" peaking at number 20.

Eric Paslay, who co-wrote the track "Friday Night", released his own version of the song in March 2013.

Critical reception

Upon its release, Own the Night received mixed-to-favourable reviews. At Metacritic, which assigns a weighted mean rating out of 100 to reviews from mainstream critics, the album received an average score of 63, based on eight reviews, which indicates "generally favorable reviews". The New York Times was very positive about Own the Night and wrote this third album "elevates this group's fecklessness to high art. It makes no apologies for its blunt-force tactics. It owns its shamelessness. That cocksure stance helps to make it one of the most convincing albums of the year, a huge leap forward for a group that threatened to become famous without leaving a true mark." Giving it a four stars rating out of five, Country Weekly Jessica Phillips appreciated that "For the most part, Lady Antebellum strikes a nice balance between the two -creating something different while replicating some elements of the previous album, keeping the penchant for bighearted ballads and the vocal chemistry between Charles Kelley and Hillary Scott intact". Billy Dukes of Taste of Country gave the album a 3.5 stars out of 5 commenting "In an effort to break new ground on their just released album, Own the Night,  Lady Antebellum occasionally forget their strengths and weaknesses. Not every courageous step they take lands on solid ground, but it’s difficult to criticize a band for taking artistic chances." Entertainment Weekly gave the album a "B" grade commenting "With their easy pop-country tempos and ingratiating white-soul harmonies, Charles Kelley, Hillary Scott, and Dave Haywood are masters of the soft sell, an approach they employ here with characteristically genteel results." Randy Lewis of The Los Angeles Times found that "everything sounds bigger, brighter and shinier than on Lady A's first two albums. That'll probably go over well with fans of grandiose country pop" but he noted that "the all-stops-out production gradually loses impact." However, Stephen Thomas Erlewine of Allmusic was less enthusiastic about the album. He gave it a three stars rating and described it as "mood music but the aim isn't amorous; it's nothing more than a spot of relaxation, which doesn't quite amount to compelling listening no matter how immaculate the execution." American Songwriter found Own the Night not "high art" and despised the "clichéd country images" but did appreciate the singing "with the band stacking its harmonies three voices deep at every twist and turn" and that's why the album received a three stars rating. Nevertheless, Rolling Stone Will Hermes was not convinced by the new album and gave it a two stars rating out of five. Jonathan Keefe of Slant Magazine negatively reviewed Own the Night: "In the past, the trio has been able to elevate their unremarkable songwriting with spirited performances, but that isn't the case on Own the Night". He found the band "across-the-board amateurish and anonymous".

Commercial performance
Own the Night debuted at number one on the US Billboard 200 chart, selling 347,000 in its first week, according to Nielsen SoundScan. This became Lady Antebellum's second US number one debut. The album is the largest start for any country release since Taylor Swift's "Speak Now" (2010). The album also debuted at number one on the US Top Country Albums chart, becoming the group third number-one debut on that chart. In its second week, the album dropped to number two on the chart, selling an additional 125,000 copies. In its third week, the album dropped to number six on the chart, selling 75,000 more copies. In its fourth week, the album climbed to number four on the chart, selling 58,000 copies. Since its release, the album has topped the US Top Country Albums chart for 13 weeks. On October 17, 2011, the album was certified platinum by the Recording Industry Association of America (RIAA) for sales of over one million copies. As of June 2013, the album has sold 1,837,525 copies in the United States.

In Canada, the album debuted at number one on the Canadian Albums Chart, selling 21,000 copies in its first week. On September 27, 2011, the album was certified platinum by Music Canada (MC) for sales of over 80,000 copies.

Own the Night Tour

The Own the Night Tour began on November 11, 2011, in Knoxville, Tennessee, and ended on October 3, 2012, in Sydney, Australia. The group played 104 shows on three continents.

Track listing

Personnel

Lady Antebellum
Dave Haywood – acoustic guitar, electric guitar, mandolin, piano, background vocals
Charles Kelley – lead vocals, background vocals
Hillary Scott – lead vocals, background vocals

Additional musicians

Bruce Bouton – dobro, steel guitar
Chad Cromwell – drums
Jason "Slim" Gambill – electric guitar, soloist
David Huff – drum loops, percussion
Rob McNelley – electric guitar, soloist
The Nashville String Machine –  strings
Mike Rojas – accordion, Hammond B-3 organ, piano, synthesizer
Kris Wilkinson – string arrangements
Karen Winklemann – penny whistle
Paul Worley – acoustic guitar, electric guitar, soloist
Craig Young – bass guitar
Jonathan Yudkin – bouzouki, cello, fiddle, acoustic guitar, harp, mandolin

Charts

Weekly charts

Year-end charts

Decade-end charts

Singles

Certifications

References

2011 albums
Albums produced by Paul Worley 
Canadian Country Music Association Top Selling Album albums
Capitol Records Nashville albums
Lady A albums
Grammy Award for Best Country Album